Arthur S. Obermayer (July 17, 1931 – January 10, 2016) was an American chemist, entrepreneur and philanthropist. He was the founder and president of the Moleculon Research Corporation. He was a co-founder of Partners for Progressive Israel and the Obermayer German Jewish History Awards.

Early life
Arthur S. Obermayer was born in Philadelphia. His "four grandparents were all German." His family came from Creglingen.

Obermayer graduated from Swarthmore College. He received a PhD in chemistry from the Massachusetts Institute of Technology (MIT).

Business career
Obermayer was an entrepreneur. He was the founder and president of the Moleculon Research Corporation, "a chemical, polymer and pharmaceutical research and development company." He was a co-founder of Zero Stage Capital. Meanwhile, he took Moleculon, Inc. public in 1981 and sold it to an Australian corporation in 1984.

Obermayer promoted government programs to help small business.  In 1976, a bill authorizing the establishment of the SBIR program was passed by Congress. Arthur Obermayer had worked with Senator Kennedy since 1970, testifying often before Congress, urging passage of R&D funding for small business. The Small Business Innovative Research (SBIR) program  was reauthorized in 1982 and that year, Obermayer's Company, Moleculon, received a SBIR grant for $25,000 from National Science Foundation (NSF). Arthur and Judith Obermayer promoted the Bayh-Dole Patent Act, which gives title for inventions that result from government-funded research to small businesses instead of their becoming the property of the government. This legislation encouraged more small businesses to apply for SBIR grants.

Arthur and Judith Obermayer were inducted into the Small Business Administration (SBA) Hall of Fame in 2015 for their contributions to the economy, during a White House ceremony, citing their role in securing the initial funding for the SBIR program. which reached a total funding of more than $50 billion by 2018. In his induction speech, Obermayer said, “Next to the G.I. Bill after WWII, the Small Business Innovation Program (SBIR) was one of the most significant pieces of legislation ever passed by Congress.” He noted that his involvement with ACS and the SBIR program were important components of his career path. With 3.2% of the Federal R&D budget in FY 2017, SBIR/STTR has created more than 22% of America's key innovations. He was an active member of the American Chemical Society (ACS) and the Northeastern Section of the American Chemical Society (NESACS).

Philanthropy
Obermayer co-founded Meretz USA, later known as Partners for Progressive Israel.

Obermayer co-founded the Obermayer German Jewish History Awards with JewishGen and the Leo Baeck Institute in 2000. He was a recipient of the Cross of the Order of Merit of the Federal Republic of Germany in 2007.

Personal life and death
Obermayer had a wife, Judith, and three children. He died of cancer on January 10, 2016, in Dedham, Massachusetts. He was the brother of  Herman Obermayer.

References

1931 births
2016 deaths
American people of German-Jewish descent
Businesspeople from Philadelphia
Businesspeople from Dedham, Massachusetts
Swarthmore College alumni
Massachusetts Institute of Technology School of Science alumni
American company founders
American business executives
Jewish American philanthropists
Deaths from cancer in Massachusetts
Philanthropists from Dedham, Massachusetts
Recipients of the Cross of the Order of Merit of the Federal Republic of Germany
20th-century American businesspeople
20th-century American philanthropists
21st-century American Jews